Steamed curry is a Southeast Asian type of curry steam-cooked in banana leaves. In Laos, it is also roasted on embers. The base of the curry is made with a curry paste with or without the addition of coconut cream or coconut milk and eggs. A wide range of leaves and staple ingredients are also added to the dish, such as:
 fish;
 bamboo shoots ((often with minced meat inside););
 chicken;
 snails;
 tofu;
 algae ((with Mekong weed)).

According to cultural anthropologist Penny Van Esterik, the Southeast Asian coconut-based curries are the result of Indianization, that in the 15th century after the Fall of Angkor, were introduced in the Ayutthaya Kingdom by Khmer royal cooks and later reintroduced back into Cambodia as the Siamese armies attacked into Cambodia. Nowadays, they are considered characteristic of individual Southeast Asian cuisines.

See also
 Otak-otak, similar fish dumpling, a Nyonya Peranakan cuisine common in Malaysia, Singapore and Indonesia
 Pepes, Indonesian dish cooking method by wrapping in banana leafs
 Botok, similar Indonesian Javanese dish wrapped in banana leaf

References

Southeast Asian curries
Curry dishes
Steamed foods